The 1947 SMU Mustangs football team was an American football team that represented Southern Methodist University (SMU) as a member of the Southwest Conference (SWC) during the 1947 college football season. In its tenth season under head coach Matty Bell, the team compiled a 9–0–2 record (5–0–1 against SWC opponents), won the SWC championship, outscored opponents by a total of 182 to 90, and was ranked No. 3 in the final AP Poll. The team played its home games at Ownby Stadium on the SMU campus and at the Cotton Bowl in Dallas.

The Mustangs won their first nine games before tying with rival TCU and Penn State, the latter in the 1948 Cotton Bowl Classic on New Year's Day.

SMU's sophomore halfback, Doak Walker, led the country with 387 yards on 10 kickoff returns, an average of 38.7 yards per return. He won the Maxwell Award for 1947, was a consensus selection to the 1947 College Football All-America Team, and finished third in the 1947 voting for the Heisman Trophy. He finished second in the SWC (behind Bobby Layne) with 1,026 yards of total offense, including 684 rushing yards.

Four SMU players received first-team honors on the Associated Press 1947 All-Southwest Conference football team: Walker; end Sid Halliday; tackle Jim Winkler; and guard Earl Cook.

Schedule

Players selected in the 1948 NFL Draft
The following SMU players were selected in the 1947 NFL Draft:

References

SMU
SMU Mustangs football seasons
Southwest Conference football champion seasons
College football undefeated seasons
SMU Mustangs football